Persepolis F.C. is a professional football club based in Tehran, Iran, which plays in the Iran Pro League. The first full-time manager of Persepolis was Parviz Dehdari in 1968. Yahya Golmohammadi is the current head coach of the Persepolis since 13 January 2020.

List of managers

From December 1963 to now, Persepolis F.C. has had thirty head coaches. fifteen of them were Iranian (one Iranian-American) and fifteen were from foreign countries. Seven persons served as caretaker head coach: Rajab Faramarzi in 1964-1968, Parviz Ghelichkhani in 1977, Masoud Moeini in 1988, Mahmoud Khordbin in 1993, Mohsen Ashouri in 1997 and 2011, Tomislav Ivić in 1998 and Hossein Abdi in 2015.

The most successful Persepolis F.C. manager in terms of trophies won is Ali Parvin, who won three league titles (one Iran Pro League, two Azadegan League), two Hazfi Cup trophy, four Tehran Provincial League, two Tehran Hazfi Cup and one Asian Cup Winners' Cup trophy in his 17-year reign as manager. Branko Ivanković is the most successful foreign head coach while Manuel José de Jesus is the worst foreign head coach.

A.  Formerly played for the club

B.  Club's first full-time manager

C.  Most honours won and longest-serving manager in club history

⚱ Died

Statistics

Last updated on 11 March 2023
Only official matches included (Iranian Football League, Hazfi Cup, Iranian Super Cup, AFC Champions League or Asian Cup Winners' Cup matches).

Managers since 2000

Managers since 1964

Longest-serving managers

Notable managers

By nationality

See also
Persepolis F.C.

References

فهرست مربیان باشگاه فوتبال پرسپولیس.  14 August 2009. In Wikipedia, The Free Encyclopedia. Retrieved 22:32, 14 August 2009, from http://fa.wikipedia.org/w/index.php?title=فهرست مربیان باشگاه فوتبال پرسپولیس&oldid=2418567

managers
Persepolis